My Father Iqbal is a 2016 Hindi movie directed by Suzad Iqbal Khan. The story focuses on Iqbal Khan, an employee at the Public Works Department.  The Times of India said that the film "has its heart in the right place," but that it ultimately "misses the mark," giving it 2.5 out of four stars.

Cast
 Narendra Jha as Iqbal Khan
Komal Thacker as Sahiba
 Paresh Mehta as Sho Police J&K
 Raj Sharma as Xen Pwd
 Amit Lekhwani as Terrorist
 Sagar Nath Jha as Junior to Iqbal khan
 Sudam Aftab Khan as Son of Iqbal Khan
 Kumar Vaibhav as MLA

Production
Produced under the banner of Yash Raj Films, the film features Narendra Jha, Komal Thakker, Paresh Mehta, Raj Sharma, Amit Lekhwani, Sagar Nath Jha and Sudam Aftab Khan. Produced by Paresh Mehta, Sagar Nath Jha and Abinash Singh Chib are the writers of the movie.

References

External links
 
 

2016 films